Wesley Paul William Streeting (born 21 January 1983) is a British Labour Party politician who has been the Shadow Secretary of State for Health and Social Care since 2021, and Member of Parliament (MP) for Ilford North since 2015. 

He served as Shadow Secretary of State for Child Poverty from May to November 2021, as Shadow Minister for Schools from 2020 to 2021, and as Shadow Exchequer Secretary to the Treasury from April to October 2020. He was also president of the National Union of Students (NUS), and Deputy Leader of Redbridge London Borough Council.

Early life, family and education
Streeting was born in Stepney, London, on 21 January 1983. Streeting's parents were teenagers when he was born. He has five brothers, a sister and a stepsister. His maternal grandfather was an armed robber who spent time in prison, and his grandmother became embroiled in his crimes and ended up in Holloway jail, where she met Christine Keeler (a key figure in the Profumo affair). According to Streeting, they "stayed in touch, they became friends." His grandmother was released from prison to give birth to his mother at Whittington Hospital. Streeting's two grandfathers, both named Bill, were key figures in his youth. His maternal grandfather was also familiar with the infamous East End Krays. He was "really well read and well informed", and engaged his grandson in lively discussions about religion and politics. Streeting’s paternal grandfather served in the Second World War in the Royal Navy and later in the merchant navy before becoming a civil engineer. He recalled: "He was the grandad I was closest to. He was a traditional working-class Tory."

He grew up in poverty living in a council flat. He recalls Conservative Party politicians in the 1990s "denigrating single-parent families like mine, which I took quite personally." He attended Westminster City School, a comprehensive state school in Victoria, London. He went on to study history at Selwyn College, University of Cambridge. Streeting previously had left the Labour Party because he opposed its decision to enter the Iraq War; however, he says Tony Blair did not act with malign intent. Streeting came out as gay in his second year of university. Streeting served as Selwyn College's Junior Common Room (JCR) President, in which capacity he was a member of Cambridge University Students' Union (CUSU) Council. He was subsequently elected CUSU President for the 2004–05 academic year, a sabbatical officer role. As CUSU President, he campaigned against the proposed closure of Cambridge's architecture department.

Working career 
Streeting was elected as President of the National Union of Students (NUS) in April 2008 as a candidate from Labour Students, with the support of the Union of Jewish Students. He had been a member of the NUS National Executive Committee since 2005, having previously held the post of Vice-President (Education) from 2006 to 2008. In April 2009, he was elected to a second term as President of the NUS. He also served as a member of the National Committee of Labour Students for four years during this time.

As President of the NUS, Streeting was a strong proponent of his predecessor Gemma Tumelty's proposed reforms to the NUS governance structures, which had been denounced and narrowly defeated by many left-wing groups in NUS as an attack on NUS democracy. His election was reported by The Guardian as "a move that will lend weight to the fight to modernise the union". As NUS President, Streeting was a non-executive director of the NUS's trading arm, NUS Services Ltd, and of Endsleigh Insurance. He was also a non-executive director of the Universities and Colleges Admissions Service (UCAS), as well as the Higher Education academy, having served on their board as Vice President (Education) when he was also a non-executive director of the Office of the Independent Adjudicator for Higher Education (OIAHE). Shortly after his election as NUS President, Streeting was appointed as a member of the government's Youth Citizenship Commission, chaired by Professor Jonathan Tonge of the University of Liverpool, which published its report in June 2009. Streeting supported university tuition fees as President, consistent with UK government policy during the New Labour years.

Streeting worked for the Labour Party-related organisation Progress for a year. After completing his term as President of the NUS, Streeting served as Chief Executive of the Helena Kennedy Foundation, an educational charity that promotes access to higher education for students from further education colleges. He went on to serve as head of education at Stonewall, a lesbian, gay, bisexual and transgender (LGBT) rights charity, where he led their Education for All campaign to tackle homophobia in schools. He was subsequently a public sector consultant with PricewaterhouseCoopers (PwC), which he gave up on election as a councillor, because Redbridge Council was a "current audit client" of the firm; this forced him to choose between keeping his job or forcing a second by-election. In 2010, shortly after leaving PwC, Streeting was appointed as Head of Policy and Strategic Communications for Oona King's unsuccessful bid to win the Labour Party's nomination to be its candidate in the 2012 London Mayoral election.

Politics

Local politics 

In a July 2010 by-election, Streeting was elected as a Labour councillor for the Chadwell ward on Redbridge London Borough Council. He held the seat for Labour by 220 votes, winning with 31.5% of the vote (a fall of 1.4% for Labour in the ward) on a 25.5% turnout (a fall of 34.5% in turnout). The by-election had been triggered by a previously elected candidate subsequently being found to be ineligible to serve on the council. Streeting was elected as Deputy Leader of the Labour Group in October 2011. In 2014, he contested the Aldborough ward on Redbridge Council, winning 2,100 votes and defeating Conservative opponent Ruth Clark.

At a public meeting of the Redbridge Citizens' Assembly on 6 May 2014, Cllr Streeting promised on behalf of his group that, if elected, he would not reduce the level of Council Tax Support provided to low-income working-age residents. Once elected, the Labour council cut the level of support, so as to treble the amount of Council Tax paid by supported residents from April 2016; the council made a further reduction from April 2017, and made a third reduction from April 2018. In May 2014, Labour took control of Redbridge Council for the first time and Streeting was appointed Deputy Leader of the Council. He resigned the latter in May 2015, shortly after being elected Member of Parliament for Ilford North. Whilst he remained a backbench councillor following his election to Parliament, he chose not to claim his councillor allowance. Streeting did not stand for re-election after being elected to Parliament, and ceased to be a councillor on 7 May 2018.

Parliamentary backbencher (2015–20) 
In the 2015 UK general election, Streeting was elected as the Member of Parliament for Ilford North. Representing the Labour Party, he overturned a Conservative majority of 5,404, winning by 589 votes. After being elected to Parliament, Streeting was elected Honorary President of the British Youth Council. He is also a Vice President of the Local Government Association and a Patron of LGBT Labour.

Following his election, Streeting was described as a "long-time critic" of Jeremy Corbyn, who was leader of the Labour Party from 2015 to 2020. He accused Corbyn of a "flat-footed and lackadaisical attitude" to tackling antisemitism which is "simply unacceptable". Prior to the 2017 UK general election, he stated that he was "not going to pretend to have had a damascene conversion" with regard to Corbyn's suitability as Prime Minister. His views provoked a response from Corbyn's supporters such as Ken Livingstone and the trade union leader Len McCluskey. Livingstone described him as "consciously undermining Jeremy and damaging the Labour party", while McCluskey said his reason for raising issues had been "about attacking Jeremy Corbyn". Streeting was among the 70 per cent of Labour MPs who nominated Owen Smith in the 2016 Labour Party leadership election.

In 2016 Streeting criticised the Labour Party for refusing a £30,000 donation from McDonald's. According to Labour, the refusal was due to the company's poor record on worker's rights and hostile stance towards trade unions. Streeting campaigned in favour of the United Kingdom remaining in the European Union in the run-up to the 2016 EU membership referendum. His constituency subsequently voted by a small-margin in favour of leaving the European Union. Afterwards, Streeting campaigned for a People's Vote, a campaign group calling for a public vote on the final Brexit deal between the UK and the European Union.

Ilford North has among the largest Jewish and Muslim communities in the UK. Streeting is a vice-chair of the All-Party Parliamentary Group against Antisemitism, a co-chair of the All Party Parliamentary Group on British Jews and a supporter of Labour Friends of Israel. He is also a co-chair of the All-Party Parliamentary Group on British Muslims and a supporter of Labour Friends of Palestine and Middle East. In September 2018, he held the last in a series of London-wide consultations to create the Working Definition of Islamophobia. In July 2018, Streeting called for "targeted economic sanctions" against Israeli settlements in the West Bank in response to the Israeli government "grossly infringing on the human rights of Palestinians". In July 2019, Streeting was reported in the media as using abusive language towards a non-Jewish antisemitism campaigner.

Shortly before the 2019 UK general election, Streeting told a Labour First meeting that the party faced electoral oblivion in any snap poll due to the leadership's poor handling of Brexit and allegations of antisemitism. Following Labour's defeat in the general election, Streeting nominated Jess Phillips and Rosena Allin-Khan in the 2020 Labour Party leadership and deputy leadership elections, and endorsed Ian Murray for the deputy leadership.

Opposition frontbencher (2020–) 
Until the 2019 general election, Streeting was a member of the Treasury Select Committee. After the election of Keir Starmer as Leader of the Labour Party, Streeting was appointed Shadow Exchequer Secretary to the Treasury. On 16 October 2020, Streeting became Shadow Minister for Schools in succession to Margaret Greenwood, who had resigned the previous day following her opposition to the Covert Human Intelligence Sources (Criminal Conduct) Bill. Abena Oppong-Asare replaced Streeting as Shadow Exchequer Secretary to the Treasury. In the May 2021 shadow cabinet reshuffle, Streeting was appointed to the Shadow Cabinet as Shadow Secretary of State for Child Poverty. He was promoted to the post of Shadow Secretary of State for Health and Social Care in the November 2021 shadow cabinet reshuffle.

On 9 November 2022, Streeting was criticised after being overheard describing Corbyn as "senile" in the House of Commons. Streeting said the comment was made "in jest" and apologised to Corbyn for the comment later that day.

Political positions
Streeting is considered to be on the right of the Labour Party; however, he objects to being labelled a Blairite, saying: "There's no future for the Labour party if it's locked in a battle between two competing visions of the past. I don’t like being pigeonholed."

On health, in December 2021, in response to growing waiting times in the NHS, Streeting said the way to reduce waiting times was better pay and conditions, while keeping a check on the six figure salaries of managers and management consultants. He added: "The biggest priority is to recruit, train and retain staff for the long term." He also placed an emphasis on investment and reform. He said that the UK government should concentrate on boosting wages for the lowest paid in the health sector. Streeting said that a Labour government would use whatever means necessary to ensure patients receive treatment, including using private health providers. Following a visit to Israel in May 2022, Streeting suggested that the UK should embrace new technologies in the health sector that are commonplace in Israel to improve outcomes. Streeting said he would stress to the Treasury that investment in health and social care would boost the economy and focusing on prevention could save thousands, if not hundreds of thousands of pounds.

Following his election, Streeting was described as a "long-time critic" of Jeremy Corbyn, who was leader of the Labour Party from 2015 until 2020. He accused Corbyn of a "flat-footed and lackadaisical attitude" to tackling antisemitism, which was "simply unacceptable". Streeting was among the 70 per cent of Labour MPs who nominated Owen Smith in the 2016 party leadership election. He said: "I always thought that Jeremy Corbyn was unelectable and there was a fundamental moral objection to where he was on anti-Semitism."

Streeting campaigned in favour of the United Kingdom remaining in the European Union in the run-up to the 2016 EU membership referendum. In 2018, he stated that a hard Brexit would address voters' concerns regarding sovereignty and migration but would provoke significant economic harm. Streeting appeared in The Sun and tweeted a link to the article saying he would be "tough on crime, tough on the causes of crime". On immigration, in 2018, Streeting said: "I regularly make the point that we need better education and training for our own people, but we should be honest with our country that we also rely on attracting people from overseas, particularly with our ageing population and shrinking working age population."

Streeting is also pro-devolution of power to give local authorities greater control over public policy. Streeting promoted the establishment of a Good Work Commission to bring together the relevant stakeholders to negotiate a new employment rights settlement. He also said he suggested "working with the best of British business to reform the worst of British capitalism". Streeting wants to tax capital gains on the same basis as income and suggested replacing inheritance tax with a lifetime gifts tax. He also supports an increase in corporation tax. Streeting has also strongly criticised those campaigning against LGBT+ education in schools.

Personal life
Streeting lives in Redbridge, London. He is in a relationship with Joseph Dancey, a communications and public affairs adviser. The couple are currently engaged to get married. Streeting, who is a practising Anglican, says his faith is "about compassion, not walking by on the other side". He says it caused serious problems when it came to his sexuality: "My faith was a really big obstacle to accepting myself."

In May 2021, Streeting revealed he had been diagnosed with kidney cancer and would be stepping back from frontline politics while he received treatment for it. He had received a phone call from his urologist informing him that tests, initially for kidney stones, revealed he had kidney cancer. He was on a campaign visit at the time. However, because the cancer was noticed early, his prognosis was good even though he needed surgery to remove the kidney. On 27 July 2021, Streeting announced that he had been declared cancer-free, following an operation to remove one of his kidneys.

References

External links
 
 
 Councillor Wes Streeting, Redbridge London Borough Council
 Interview with Tiger Television at Birmingham City University
 

|-

1983 births
Living people
Alumni of Selwyn College, Cambridge
Councillors in the London Borough of Redbridge
Gay politicians
Labour Party (UK) councillors
Labour Party (UK) MPs for English constituencies
Labour Party (UK) people
Labour Friends of Israel
Labour Friends of Palestine and the Middle East
LGBT members of the Parliament of the United Kingdom
English LGBT politicians
Presidents of the National Union of Students (United Kingdom)
UK MPs 2019–present
Shadow Secretaries of State for Health
UK MPs 2015–2017
UK MPs 2017–2019
English Anglicans
LGBT Anglicans